Liwaito (also Lewytos and Liguaytoy) is a former settlement of the Patwin branch of the Wintun tribe in Yolo County, California. The name means "waiving" in the Patwin language, and was also applied to Putah Creek.  It lay at an elevation of 135 feet (41 m).  Its location is quite near Winters, California.

References

External links

Patwin
Wintun villages
Former settlements in Yolo County, California
Former Native American populated places in California
Winters, California